Kappawanta (also known as Kappawanta Station) is both a pastoral lease that operates as a sheep station and a gazetted bounded locality in South Australia.

The eastern part of  Kappawanta includes most of the Bascombe Well Conservation Park.

In 1862 Kappawanta was owned by Thomas Horn and Edward Kent when they dissolved their partnership. In 1863 the station was stocked with 5,345 sheep.

In 1888 the  property that had an estimated £3,182 worth of improvements was placed on the market for auction. The following year all the station stock and plant was sold off and the property was effectively abandoned.

Messrs R Myers and Son, who had acquired the property some time prior to 1893, placed the property up for auction in 1896. By 1898 the property was owned by Edward Morris, who acquired it after winning the lottery. Morris remained on the property routinely producing between 90 and 160 bales of wool each year until he died after a brief illness at age 56 in 1908.

Elizabeth Morris continued to run the property, with her sons eventually taking over management. In 1932 large areas of Kappawanta and neighbouring properties Hillside and Portanna, were all swept by bushfires that started from lightning strikes. Severe storms hit the area in 1942 with the homestead being unroofed and many windmills being blown over.

George and Edward Morris owned the station until 1948, when they sold it to R. Sheehan.

The boundaries of the locality of Kappawanta were formalised in November 1999 for the long established local name. It includes the cadastral hundreds of Kappawanta, Blesing and Hudd, and sections of the hundreds of Barwell, Cowan and Tinline.

See also
List of ranches and stations

References

Pastoral leases in South Australia
Stations (Australian agriculture)
Eyre Peninsula